Lee Moo-saeng (born May 10, 1980), is a South Korean actor. He is best known for his roles in the television dramas The World of the Married (2020), The Silent Sea (2021), Thirty-Nine (2022), and Cleaning Up (2022).

 Career 

 2020–present: Rise in popularity 
In 2020, Lee gained popularity with his performance in the melodrama romance series The World of the Married. In the same year, he was cast in Netflix's original seriesThe Silent Sea with Bae Doona and Gong Yoo.

In 2021, he was cast in the romance drama Thirty-Nine'' alongside Son Ye-jin and Jeon Mi-do.

Personal life 
Lee married his girlfriend in 2011 and they have two children, a son and a daughter.

Filmography

Film

Television series

Web series

References 

1980 births
South Korean male web series actors
Living people
21st-century South Korean male actors
South Korean male television actors
South Korean television personalities
South Korean male film actors